Giulio Caracciolo (died 1599) was a Roman Catholic prelate who served as Archbishop (Personal Title) of Cassano all'Jonio (1597–1599) and Archbishop of Trani (1593–1597).

Biography
On 31 Mar 1593, Giulio Caracciolo was appointed during the papacy of Pope Clement VIII as Archbishop of Trani.
On 8 Jan 1597, he was appointed during the papacy of Pope Clement VIII as Archbishop (Personal Title) of Cassano all'Jonio.
He served as Archbishop of Cassano all'Jonio until his death in 1599.

References

External links and additional sources
 (for Chronology of Bishops) 
 (for Chronology of Bishops)  
 (for Chronology of Bishops) 
 (for Chronology of Bishops)  

16th-century Roman Catholic archbishops in the Kingdom of Naples
Bishops appointed by Pope Clement VIII
1599 deaths